"Footsteps" is the lead single by American rock band Pop Evil from Up, their fourth studio album.

Music video 
The video was directed by Swedish director Johan Carlen and was released on August 12, 2015.

Charts

Weekly charts

Year-end charts

Certifications

References 

Pop Evil songs
2015 songs
2015 singles
Songs written by Dave Bassett (songwriter)
Song recordings produced by Adam Kasper